Dominic Filiou (February 27, 1977 – January 2, 2019) was a Canadian strongman of Greek ancestry. Filiou was best known for competing in the 2005, 2006, and 2007 World's Strongest Man competitions. In 2005 he finished third in the finals, a career best. In 2006 and 2007 he was eliminated during the qualifying heats. He was the 2007 winner of Canada's Strongest Man making him the first man to defeat Hugo Girard on Canadian soil (Girard was still recovering from a knee operation 14 months prior to the competition). 
 He died of a heart attack on 2 January 2019.

References

1977 births
2019 deaths
Canadian strength athletes
Sportspeople from Quebec
Canadian people of Greek descent